In baseball, an inside-the-park home run is a play where a batter hits a home run without hitting the ball out of the field of play. It is also known as an "inside-the-parker", "in-the-park home run", or "in-the-park homer".

Discussion
To score an inside-the-park home run, the player must touch all four bases (in the order of first, second, and third, ending at home plate) before a fielder on the opposing team can tag him out. If the defensive team commits one or more errors during the play, it is not scored as a home run, but rather advancing on an error. At advanced levels of play, the batter scoring due to one or more errors by the defense is colloquially referred to as a Little League home run.

The vast majority of home runs occur when the batter hits the ball beyond the outfield fence on the fly. This is purely a feat of hitting with power, along with a fortuitous flight angle of the ball. The inside-the-park home run has a  different character: it combines fast baserunning with a strong hit. Statistically, an inside-the-park home run is counted no differently than any other home run in a player's season and career totals.

In the early days of Major League Baseball (MLB), with outfields more spacious (such as that of the Polo Grounds), angular wall positioning to fit the property's limits, and less uniformity in field dimensions from ballpark to ballpark, inside-the-park home runs were common. However, in the modern era, with smaller and circumferential outfields and walls defined by minimum standards, the feat has become increasingly rare, happening only a handful of times each season.

Today an inside-the-park home run is typically accomplished by a fast baserunner hitting the ball in a direction that bounces far away from the opposing team's fielders, or in unusual weather conditions like heavy wind gusts or rain-soaked fields where a fielder's traction is drastically reduced, or the ball cannot be fielded easily. Sometimes (such as Alcides Escobar's inside-the-park homer in the 2015 World Series), the outfielder misjudges the ball, loses it in the stadium floodlights or in a domed stadium, cannot track the ball as it strikes some kind of obstruction above not covered by a stadium's ground rules, or otherwise misplays it, but not so badly that an error is charged.

Major League Baseball statistics

Of the 154,483 home runs hit between 1951 and 2000, only 975 (0.63%; about one per 158) were inside-the-park. The percentage has dwindled since the increase in emphasis on power hitting, which began in the 1920s. While Jesse Burkett, who played in the major leagues from 1890 to 1905, had 55 career inside-the-park home runs, the leader since 1950 is Willie Wilson, who played in the major leagues from 1976 to 1994, with 13.

Records

Source:

In the World Series

Rare occurrences

On July 13, 1896, Ed Delahanty of the Philadelphia Phillies hit four home runs in one game (itself an extraordinarily rare feat), two of which were inside-the-park home runs. This event was the only time any homers in a four-homer game were inside-the-park.
On April 27, 1949, Pete Milne hit an inside-the-park grand slam for his only career home run. It gave the New York Giants an 11–8 lead over the Brooklyn Dodgers, which was also the final score.
On July 25, 1956, Roberto Clemente became the only MLB player to hit a walk-off inside-the-park grand slam in a 9–8 Pittsburgh Pirates win over the Chicago Cubs, at Forbes Field.
On August 27, 1977, Texas Rangers teammates Toby Harrah and Bump Wills hit back-to-back inside the park home runs.
Exhibition Stadium, due to its proximity to Lake Ontario, facilitated a bizarre in-the-park home run for Kelly Gruber of the Toronto Blue Jays in 1986, when an otherwise routine pop up was lost by the Detroit Tigers outfielders in the thick fog.
On October 4, 1986, during a Twins' home game at the Hubert H. Humphrey Metrodome, Greg Gagne tied a modern-era major league record by hitting two inside-the-park home runs against the Chicago White Sox. Only 18 players in major league history have performed this feat, with Gagne being just the second since 1930. Both home runs were hit off Chicago starting pitcher Floyd Bannister, who also tied a modern-era major league record by allowing two inside-the-park home runs in one game. The Twins went on to win the game, 7–3.
On June 17, 2007, Prince Fielder of the Milwaukee Brewers hit a popup to center field that became an inside-the-park home run when Minnesota Twins outfielder Lew Ford lost the ball after it struck a speaker on the ceiling of the Metrodome. On June 19, 2008, he hit another inside-the-park-homer at Miller Park in Milwaukee, versus the Toronto Blue Jays.
In the 2007 All-Star Game, Ichiro Suzuki became the only player to hit an inside-the-park home run in an All-Star Game, hitting it at AT&T Park in San Francisco. Suzuki, playing for the victorious American League All-Stars, earned Most Valuable Player honors.
On April 6, 2009, Emilio Bonifacio of the Florida Marlins became the first player in 41 years to hit an inside-the-park home run on Opening Day, which was also the first home run of Bonifacio's major league career.

On August 18, 2009, Kyle Blanks of the San Diego Padres hit an inside-the-park home run against the Chicago Cubs. Weighing , he became the heaviest player to hit an inside-the-park home run.
On July 18, 2010, Jhonny Peralta of the Cleveland Indians hit a three-run inside-the-park home run when Detroit Tigers outfielder Ryan Raburn crashed through the bullpen fence while trying to catch the ball. Peralta was one of the slowest runners then on the Indians' roster, and would be traded to the Tigers ten days later. He took 16.74 seconds to round the bases, which was, at that point in the 2010 season, the slowest of any inside-the-park home run and slower than five regular home run trots.
On May 25, 2013, Ángel Pagán of the San Francisco Giants hit an inside-the-park home run at AT&T Park in San Francisco, a tenth inning, two-run walk-off home run, with teammate Brandon Crawford on base. It was the first walk-off inside-the-park home run since 2004, when Rey Sanchez of the Devil Rays hit one, also in the bottom of the tenth inning, also against the Rockies, albeit in a tie game.
On July 8, 2015, Logan Forsythe of the Tampa Bay Rays hit an inside-the-park home run in the 4th inning against the Kansas City Royals when, in attempting to field the ball, Royals left fielder Alex Gordon injured his groin. Gordon was replaced by Jarrod Dyson, who hit an inside-the-park home run of his own in the 6th inning of the game. Dyson's hit went past Rays left fielder David DeJesus, who, like Gordon, had been injured five years earlier, on July 22, 2010, while playing for the Royals on a play that led to an inside-the-park home run for Derek Jeter.
On September 2, 2015, Rubén Tejada of the New York Mets hit the ball down the right-field foul line, under the glove of Philadelphia Phillies outfielder Domonic Brown who, running full speed, flipped over the out-of-play wall in foul territory. Brown was unable to return to field the ball and it rolled to the deep right field fence in Citi Field before it was fielded by Phillies second baseman Cesar Hernández. Kelly Johnson also scored on the play. Brown later left the game with concussion-like symptoms. At 74.5 mph off the bat, it was the softest-hit home run of the season to that point.
On October 27, 2015, Alcides Escobar of the Kansas City Royals hit an inside-the-park home run in Game 1 of the 2015 World Series.
During the regionals for the 2022 College World Series, Louisiana Tech Bulldog catcher Jorge Corona hit a high fly ball to centerfield in a bases loaded situation, with the Dallas Baptist Patriot centerfielder losing the ball in the lights of UFCU Disch–Falk Field, it bouncing well behind him to the wall and Corona easily clearing the bases standing up for an inside-the-park grand slam.
On July 22, 2022, Raimel Tapia of the Toronto Blue Jays hit a high fly ball to center field with 2 outs and the bases loaded against the Boston Red Sox at Fenway Park. Jarren Duran, the center fielder, lost sight of the ball in Fenway's lights and it landed far behind him on the warning track, allowing Tapia to easily clear the bases giving him an inside-the-park grand slam. Toronto went on to score a franchise-record 28 runs in the game.
On October 15, 2022 J.T. Realmuto of the Philadelphia Phillies hit an inside-the-park home run at Citizens Bank Park during a playoff game against the Atlanta Braves, becoming the first catcher to do so in postseason history.

References

External links
 Baseball Almanac Records
 Baseball's most exciting play

Baseball terminology